The Former Church of St Mary, Wythall is a Grade II listed redundant parish church in the Church of England in Wythall, Worcestershire.

History

The church was built in 1862 by Frederick Preedy. The landmark tower was added in 1908 by William Bidlake, the gift of the Misses Mynors in memory of their parents. The font was installed in the 1960s from Immanuel Church, Birmingham when this church was demolished.

The building closed for worship in 1986, and the building is now owned by a firm of electrical contractors. From 1987 to 2014 the congregation met in local school halls, most recently Coppice Primary School.  At Easter 2014 the new St Mary's Church was opened on Shawhurst Lane in Hollywood, on the Coppice School site.

More information on the history of the church and its building can be found at Wythall Church (history).

Organ

The organ dates from 1908 by Nicholson and Co. A specification of the organ can be found on the National Pipe Organ Register.

Churchyard

The churchyard contains the war graves of eight Commonwealth service personnel of the Second World War.

References

External links 

 Wythall Church website

Wythall
Wythall
William Bidlake buildings
Churches completed in 1862